Jit Singh (born 13 January 1937) is an Indian wrestler. He competed in the men's freestyle middleweight at the 1964 Summer Olympics.

References

External links
 

1937 births
Living people
Indian male sport wrestlers
Olympic wrestlers of India
Wrestlers at the 1964 Summer Olympics
Place of birth missing (living people)
Asian Games medalists in wrestling
Wrestlers at the 1970 Asian Games
Asian Games silver medalists for India
Medalists at the 1970 Asian Games